Jean de Tournes (1504 – 1564) was a French printer, book publisher and bookseller, and the founder of a long-lasting family printing business.

Life 

Jean de Tournes was born in Lyon in 1504. He was apprenticed in the printing workshop of Gaspard and Melchior Trechsel, and then worked for about ten years as a compositor in the workshops of Sébastien Gryphe. In 1542 de Tournes set up his own shop, where from 1547 until 1563 he was in partnership with his son-in-law Guillaume Gazeau. He was a learned humanist, and published accurate editions of works of both ancient and modern authors. Until 1547 he employed the engraver Georges Riverdy for illustrated works; after that date he used the noted engraver Bernard Salomon. He converted to Protestantism in about 1545.

Jean de Tournes died of plague in Lyon on 7 September 1564. He was succeeded in the business by his son Jean de Tournes. In 1585 the family and the printing works moved to Geneva in order to escape religious persecution as Huguenots in the French Wars of Religion.  In 1727 they returned to Lyon, and in 1906 they were among the founders of the Imprimeries réunies in that city.

The emblem of the de Tournes press was two entwined vipers.

Publications 

He published accurate editions of the works of authors including Petrarch (1545), Dante (1547), Marguerite de Navarre (1547), Vitruvius (1552) and Froissart (1559–61). He published numerous works in Latin, Italian and other languages, including a Latin version of Guillaume Le Sueur's account of the Martin Guerre affair (1561). Illustrated books from his press include the Emblemata of Andrea Alciati (1547), Aesop's Fables (1547), the Quadrins historiques de la Bible (1553) and the Metamorphoses of Ovid (1557).

References 

1504 births
1564 deaths
16th-century deaths from plague (disease)
French book publishers (people)
French printers
Businesspeople from Lyon